Lipstick on Your Collar may refer to:

"Lipstick on Your Collar" (song), 1959 song by Connie Francis
Lipstick on Your Collar (TV series), a 1993 British TV series